Artyomovsky (masculine), Artyomovskaya (feminine), or Artyomovskoye (neuter) is the name of several inhabited localities in Russia.

Urban localities
Artyomovsky, Irkutsk Oblast, a work settlement in Bodaybinsky District of Irkutsk Oblast
Artyomovsky, Sverdlovsk Oblast, a town in Sverdlovsk Oblast

Rural localities
Artyomovskaya, Moscow Oblast, a village in Savvinskoye Rural Settlement of Yegoryevsky District of Moscow Oblast
Artyomovskaya, Kharovsky District, Vologda Oblast, a village in Azletsky Selsoviet of Kharovsky District of Vologda Oblast
Artyomovskaya, Syamzhensky District, Vologda Oblast, a village in Ramensky Selsoviet of Syamzhensky District of Vologda Oblast

Historical inhabited localities
Artyomovsky, Primorsky Krai, a former urban-type settlement in Primorsky Krai; now a part of the town of Artyom